Lee Sanderson (born 16 December 1981) is a former professional rugby league footballer who played as a  for the Leigh Centurions, London Broncos, Oldham and the Rochdale Hornets. He also spent time on loan from Leigh at St Helens in the European Super League, and from the Broncos at the London Skolars in National League Two.

Background
Sanderson was born in Salford, Greater Manchester, England on 16 December 1981. Daughter is Jazmin Greenwood.

Leigh Centurions
He played for Leigh East and Leigh Miners as a junior and joined the Leigh Centurions as a professional, featuring in a number of friendlies in 2000. In 2001 he made his debut for the club in the Northern Ford Premiership, scoring four tries against Hunslet in the process. As a teenager he won the 2001 Northern Ford Premiership with the Centurions. Following a broken jaw he received in 2002, he spent time on loan at St Helens.

London Broncos
Sanderson was brought to London ahead of the 2004 Super League season, with the side from the capital paying a transfer fee to take him from Hilton Park. His 2004 season was disrupted by injury. He had knee reconstruction surgery in January 2005 ahead of the 2005 Super League season. In 2005, after undergoing major surgery on his knee, he spent time on loan from the Broncos at the London Skolars in National League Two. He did not take the field for the Broncos first team in 2005 and was released at the end of his contract in 2005.

Rochdale Hornets
He was out of the game for 18 months with a serious injury before joining the Rochdale Hornets.

Oldham
He later played for Oldham.

Personal life
His father, Mark Sanderson also played for Rochdale, and Lee's grandfather Bill Sanderson and great-grandfather Joe Sanderson both played for Leigh in the 1930s and 1950s respectively. Lee's uncle Ian Sanderson also played for the Roughyeds.

References

External links
London Broncos profile

1981 births
Living people
English rugby league players
Leigh Leopards players
London Broncos players
London Skolars players
Oldham R.L.F.C. players
Rochdale Hornets players
Rugby league halfbacks
Rugby league players from Salford